Erica Roby is a retired American actress, known for her work with the film studio The Asylum.

Actress 

Much of Roby's work consists of low-budget horror films, again products of The Asylum. Her lead-roles include Exorcism: The Possession of Gail Bowers (2006) and the science-fiction film Invasion of the Pod People (2007).

Crewmember 

Roby has since retired from acting, and has appeared in production credits for Celebrity Rehab with Dr. Drew (story editor), Denise Richards: It's Complicated (story editor) and the thirteenth season of The Amazing Race (associate producer)

Filmography 

 2006 Exorcism: The Possession of Gail Bowers as Gail Bowers
 2006 Hillside Cannibals as Rhian
 2006 Bram Stoker's Dracula's Curse as Christina Lockheart
 2006 The Apocalypse as Laura
 2006 The 9/11 Commission Report as Melinda
 2006 Halloween Night as Angela
 2007 The Hitchhiker as Lindsey
 2007 Invasion of the Pod People as Melissa

References

External links

American film actresses
Living people
Year of birth missing (living people)
21st-century American women